
Cárdenas or Cardenas may refer to:

People
Cárdenas (surname)

Places

Cuba
Cárdenas, Cuba
Bay of Cárdenas

Mexico
Cárdenas, San Luis Potosí
Cárdenas, Tabasco
Lázaro Cárdenas, Michoacán
Lázaro Cárdenas, Quintana Roo

Nicaragua
Cárdenas, Rivas

Panama
Cárdenas, Panama

Spain
Cárdenas, La Rioja

Venezuela
Cárdenas Municipality, Táchira, a municipality in Táchira, Venezuela

Companies
Cardenas (supermarket), a supermarket chain in the United States